Enda McClafferty (born 19 May 1970) is an Irish journalist who is the political editor of BBC Northern Ireland. He was appointed to the role in December 2020.

Early life
McClafferty was born in Letterkenny, Ireland and attended Ulster University.

Career
McClafferty joined BBC Northern Ireland in 2000 as a Breakfast Show presenter on BBC Radio Foyle. He later worked on Spotlight and as a political correspondent before being appointed political editor in 2020.

References

Irish political writers
Irish political journalists
1970 births
Living people